Zhukiv (Ukrainian Жуків), is a major village in Ternopil Raion of Ternopil Oblast, Ukraine. It is located about 8 km north of Berezhany, beside the hill named Huk. Zhukiv belongs to Berezhany urban hromada, one of the hromadas of Ukraine.

It is the native village of the famous Ukrainian writer Bohdan Lepky.

Zhukiv is located on banks of the river Zolota Lypa near Mountain Him, which is the largest mountain in Zhukiv.
Population - 828 persons (2014). Yards - 240.

History

The first written mention - 1420. Then Zhukiv received Magdeburg rights owned settlement was J. Labonte of Zhukiv.
1530 Zhukiv - Mikolay Sieniavski  property.
In 1626 as a result of the attack Tatar village was destroyed by 54%.
In 1880 there lived and worked Sylvester Lepky (pen name Mark Marian Murawa). There he is buried.  He was the father of Bohdan Lepky.

Until 18 July 2020, Zhukiv belonged to Berezhany Raion. The raion was abolished in July 2020 as part of the administrative reform of Ukraine, which reduced the number of raions of Ternopil Oblast to three. The area of Berezhany Raion was merged into Ternopil Raion.

References

Villages in Ternopil Raion
Magdeburg rights